Baghdad railway station located on Hasilpur road Bahawalpur Pakistan at the elevation of 393 feet from sea level.

See also
 List of railway stations in Pakistan
 Pakistan Railways

References

Railway stations in Bahawalpur District
Railway stations on Samasata–Amruka Branch Line